Mount Labo, is a potentially active stratovolcano in the province of Camarines Norte, in the Bicol Region (Region V), on Luzon Island, in the Philippines. It is located at the northwest end of the Bicol Peninsula.

Physical features
Labo is a forested andesitic stratovolcano, surrounded by numerous andesitic to dacitic satellite lava domes. It has an elevation of  asl. Labo is thermally active with both warm and hot springs.

Economic activities
Mount Labo has been the object of an extensive geothermal exploration program.

Eruptions
Mid-Pleistocene eruptions beginning about 580,000 years ago formed lava domes on the northern side of the complex. The present edifice was formed beginning about 270,000 years ago, and flank lava dome emplacement took place from about 200,000 to about 40,000 years ago.

The latest activity from Mt. Labo produced pyroclastic flows from the summit cone about 27,000 years ago. There have been no eruptions since.

Geology
Rock type is predominantly hornblende-biotite andesite to dacite. Tectonically, Labo is part of the Bicol Volcanic belt.

Listings
The Smithsonian Institution's Global Volcanism Program lists Labo as Pleistocene. Philippine Institute of Volcanology and Seismology (PHIVOLCS) lists Labo as Potentially Active.

See also
 List of active volcanoes in the Philippines
 List of potentially active volcanoes in the Philippines
 List of inactive volcanoes in the Philippines
 List of Ultras of the Philippines
 Philippine Institute of Volcanology and Seismology
 Pacific ring of fire

References

External links
 Philippine Institute of Volcanology and Seismology (PHIVOLCS), Labo page (archived)

Stratovolcanoes of the Philippines
Subduction volcanoes
Volcanoes of Luzon
Mountains of the Philippines
Landforms of Camarines Norte
Potentially active volcanoes of the Philippines
Pleistocene stratovolcanoes